Pericentriolar material (PCM, sometimes also called pericent matrix) is a highly structured, dense mass of protein which makes up the part of the animal centrosome that surrounds the two centrioles. The PCM contains proteins responsible for microtubule nucleation and anchoring including γ-tubulin, pericentrin and ninein.

Although the PCM appears amorphous by electron microscopy, super-resolution microscopy finds that it is highly organized. The PCM have 9-fold symmetry that mimics the symmetry of the centriole. Some PCM proteins are organized such that one end of the protein is found near the centriole and the other end is farther away from the centriole.
The PCM size is dynamic during the cell cycle. After cell division, the PCM size is reduced in a process named centrosome reduction. During the G2 phase of the cell cycle, the PCM grows in size in a process named centrosome maturation.

According to the Gene Ontology, the following human proteins are associated with the PCM :

 BBS4, Bardet-Biedl syndrome 4 protein
 Lck, Proto-oncogene tyrosine-protein kinase LCK
 PCM1, Pericentriolar material 1 protein
 TNKS, Tankyrase-1
 TNKS2, Tankyrase-2
 TUBE1, Tubulin epsilon chain
 PCNT, pericentrin, a matrix scaffold protein
 CDK5RAP2, cyclin dependant kinase receptor associated protein 2, binds gTubRCs that nucleate microtubules
 NEDD1, binds gTubRCs that stabilise microtubules
 Gamma Tubulin, nucleates microtubules

References

Cell biology